Outaya is a monotypic moth genus of the family Noctuidae. Its only species, Outaya grisescens, is found in Tunisia. Both the genus and species were first described by Pierre Chrétien in 1911.

References

Acontiinae
Monotypic moth genera